Matthew Kemp may refer to:

 Matthew Kemp (footballer) (born 1980), Australian footballer
 Matt Kemp (born 1984), American baseball player
 Matty Kemp (1907–1999), American actor